Chris Ballingall (born May 17, 1932) is a former professional baseball catcher who played in the All-American Girls Professional Baseball League (AAGPBL) in 1953 and 1954.

A native of Ann Arbor, Michigan, Ballingall learned to play baseball while catching for her twin brother. She had originally been offered a contract at the age of 15 to play in the AAGPBL, but her father did not want her to play then. She had to wait six years before being signed in 1953. She entered the league with the Muskegon Belles, and was traded to the Kalamazoo Lassies during the midseason. She also appeared in a few games at first base and outfield.
 
In 1954, Ballingall posted a .242 batting average with 17 home runs and 40 runs batted in in 90 games. In the playoffs, she hit .444 with eight RBI and two home runs, including one grand slam, to help the Lassies clinch the AAGPBL last championship title. She and her teammate Carol Habben, who hit a total of 16 homers (one in postseason), were dubbed the "Home Run Twins" by terrorizing opponents with their bats all the way through the lineup.

Ballingall is currently living in Mattawan, Michigan.

Statistics

Regular season
Batting

Fielding

Postseason
Batting

Fielding

References

Sources
Encyclopedia of women and baseball - Leslie A. Heaphy, Mel Anthony May. Publisher: McFarland & Co., 2006. Format: Paperback, 438 pp. Language: English. 
The Women of the All-American Girls Professional Baseball League: A biographical dictionary - W. C. Madden. Publisher: McFarland & Co., 1997. Format: Paperback, 295 pp. Language: English. 

1932 births
Living people
All-American Girls Professional Baseball League players
Baseball players from Ann Arbor, Michigan
People from Mattawan, Michigan
Muskegon Belles players
Kalamazoo Lassies players
Baseball catchers
21st-century American women